Nationality words link to articles with information on the nation's poetry or literature (for instance, Irish or France).

Events
 Following the fall of the Greek military junta in 1974, poets, authors and intellectuals who had fled after the coup of 1967 return, and this year many begin publishing in that country.
 Radical Australian poet Dorothy Hewett publishes her collection Rapunzel in Suburbia, triggering a successful libel action by her lawyer ex-husband Lloyd Davies.
 Brick Books, a small literary press, is founded in London, Ontario, by Stan Dragland and Don McKay to publish work by Canadian poets, initially as a publisher of chapbooks.

Works published in English
Listed by nation where the work was first published and again by the poet's native land, if different; substantially revised works listed separately:

Canada
 Earle Birney, The collected poems of Earle Birney. Toronto: McClelland and Stewart.
 Don Domanski, The Cape Breton Book of the Dead
 Louis Dudek. Selected Poems. Ottawa: Golden Dog, 1975.
Archibald Lampman, * Lampman's Kate: Late Love Poems of Archibald Lampman, Margaret Coulby Whitridge ed. (Ottawa: Borealis).
 Irving Layton, The Darkening Fire: Selected Poems, 1945–1968. Toronto: McClelland and Stewart.
 Irving Layton, The Unwavering Eye: Selected Poems, 1969–1975. Toronto: McClelland and Stewart.
 Dorothy Livesay, Ice Age. Erin, ON: Porcepic.
 James Reaney, Selected Shorter Poems, Erin: Porcepic.
Joe Rosenblatt, Dream Craters. Press Porcepic.
Joe Rosenblatt, Virgins & Vampires. McClelland & Stewart.
Raymond Souster, Double Header: As Is; Lost & Found. Ottawa: Oberon Press.
Raymond Souster, Rain Check. Ottawa:Oberon Press.
 Raymond Souster and Richard Woollatt, eds. These Loved, These Hated Lands. Toronto: Doubleday.
 George Woodcock, Notes on Visitations: Poems 1936-75, Toronto: Anansi, Canada

India in English
 Ruskin Bond, Lone Fox Dancing: Lyric Poems, Calcutta: Writers Workshop, India .
 G. S. Sharat Chandra, Offsprings of Servagna, Calcutta: Writers Workshop, India.
 Rita Dalmiya, Poems, Calcutta: Writers Workshop, India
 Mary Ann Das Gupta, The Circus of Love, Calcutta: Writers Workshop, India
 Prabhu Siddartha Guptara, Beginnings, Calcutta: Writers Workshop, India
 Pranab Bandyopadhyay, The Voice of the Indian Poets: An Anthology of Indian Poetry, Calcutta: United Writers

Ireland
 Eavan Boland, The War Horse, Irish poet published in the United Kingdom
 Paul Durcan, O Westport in the Light of Asia Minor, Irish poet published in the United Kingdom
 Seamus Heaney, Northern Ireland poet published in the United Kingdom:
 Stations, Ulsterman Publications
 North, Faber & Faber
 Bog Poems, Rainbow Press
 Derek Mahon, The Snow Party. Oxford University Press, Northern Ireland poet published in the United Kingdom
 Eiléan Ní Chuilleanáin: Site of Ambush, Dublin: The Gallery Press

New Zealand
 Alistair Campbell, Dreams, Yellow Lions
 Lauris Edmond, In Middle Air
 Bill Manhire, Song Cycle, New Zealand
 Ian Wedde:
 Earthly: Sonnets for Carlos
 Pathway to the Sea

United Kingdom

 Arthur J. Ball, Collected Poems
 Thomas Blackburn, Selected Poems
 Eavan Boland, The War Horse Irish poet published in the United Kingdom
 Edwin Brock, The Blocked Heart
 Alan Brownjohn, A Song of Good Life
 Charles Causley, Collected Poems 1951–1975 (see also Collected Poems 1997)
 Maureen Duffy, Evesong
 Paul Durcan, O Westport in the Light of Asia Minor, Irish poet published in the United Kingdom
 John Fuller, The Mountain in the Sea
 Roy Fuller, From the Joke Shop
 Roger Garfitt, West of Elm
 Robert Graves, Collected Poems
 Seamus Heaney, Northern Ireland poet published in the United Kingdom:
 Stations, Ulsterman Publications
 North, Faber & Faber
 Bog Poems, Rainbow Press
 John Heath-Stubbs, A Parliament of Birds
 Adrian Henri, The Best of Henri: Selected Poems 1960–70, London: Jonathan Cape, 
 Geoffrey Hill, Somewhere is Such a Kingdom
 Michael Ivens, Born Early
 Clive James, The Fate of Felicity Fark in the Land of the Media: a moral poem, Australian poet resident in the United Kingdom
 Elizabeth Jennings, Growing-Points
 Linton Kwesi Johnson, Dread, Beat and' Blood
 George MacBeth, In the Hours Waiting for the Blood to Come
 Derek Mahon, The Snow Party. Oxford University Press, Northern Ireland poet published in the United Kingdom
 Christopher Middleton, The Lonely Suppers of W. V. Balloon
 Adrian Mitchell, The Apeman Cometh
 Norman Nicholson, Cloud on Black Combe
 Leslie Norris, Mountains, Polecats, Pheasants and other Elegies
 Ruth Pitter, End of Drought
 Peter Porter, Living in a Calm Country
 J. H. Prynne, High Pink on Chrome
 James Reeves, Collected Poems
 Edgell Rickword, Collected Poems
 Alan Ross, Open Sea
 Vernon Scannell, The Loving Game: poems
 Peter Scupham, Prehistories
 Henry Shore, Selected Poems
 Iain Sinclair, Lud Heat
 Stevie Smith, Collected Poems
 R. S. Thomas, Laboratories of the Spirit, Welsh
 J. R. Tolkien, translator, Sir Gawain and the Green Knight, Pearl and Sir Orfeo
 John Wain, Feng: a poem
 Hugo Williams, Some Sweet Day

Anthologies in the United Kingdom
 John Barrell and John Bull (eds), The Penguin Book of English Pastoral Verse
 J. M. Cohen, A Choice of Comic and Curious Verse
 Peter Redgrove (ed.), Lamb and Thundercloud, from the Arvon Foundation creative writing courses at Totleigh Barton Manor in Devon
 Wole Soyinka (ed.), Poems of Black Africa, Heinemann African Writers Series; published in the United Kingdom; Martin Secker & Warburg Ltd, published in April (also published in the United States, in May)
 Poetry Introduction (Faber & Faber) the third in the series
 Treble Poets (Chatto & Windus)

Criticism, scholarship and biography in the United Kingdom
 Edward Lucie-Smith, The Burnt Child, autobiography
 Norman Nicholson, Wednesday Early Closing, autobiography
 Laurie Lee, I Can't Stay Long, mostly travel pieces by this poet
 Kathleen Raine, The Land Unknown, autobiography

United States

 A.R. Ammons, Diversifications: Poems
 Maya Angelou, Oh Pray My Wings are Gonna Fit Me Well
 John Ashbery:
 Self-portrait in a Convex Mirror later awarded the Pulitzer Prize, the National Book Award, and the National Book Critics Circle Award
 Vermont Notebook
 Ted Berrigan, A Feeling For Leaving
 Gwendolyn Brooks, Beckonings
 Lin Carter, Dreams from R'lyeh
 Robert Creeley, Backwards and The Door: Selected Poems
 Ed Dorn and Jennifer Dunbar, Manchester Square, Permanent Press
 Ed Dorn, Collected Poems: 1956–1974, Four Seasons Foundation
 Allen Ginsberg, "Hadda be Playin' on a Jukebox"
 Marilyn Hacker, Presentation Piece
 Michael S. Harper, Nightmare Begins Responsibility
 John Hollander, Tales Told of the Fathers
 Erica Jong, Loveroot
 Kenneth Koch, The Art of Love
 W. S. Merwin, The First Four Books of Poems, containing A Mask for Janus, The Dancing Bears, Green with Beasts, and The Drunk in the Furnace, New York: Atheneum; (reprinted in 2000, Port Townsend, Washington: Copper Canyon Press)
 Joyce Carol Oates, The Fabulous Beasts
 George Oppen, Collected Poems (New Directions)
 Charles Olson, The Maximus Poems, third volume (posthumous)
 Carl Rakosi, Ex Cranium, Night
 Charles Reznikoff, Holocaust
 Adrienne Rich, Poems: Selected and New, 1950–1974
 Charles Wright, Bloodlines

Anthologies in the United States
 Duane Niatum (ed.), Carriers of the Dream Wheel: Contemporary Native American Poetry, New York: Harper, anthology 
 Kenneth Rosen (ed.), Voices of the Rainbow: Contemporary Poetry by American Indians, New York: Viking Press
 Wole Soyinka (ed.), Poems of Black Africa, part of the Heinemann African Writers Series; Farrar, Straus & Giroux, published in May (published in April in the United Kingdom),

Criticism, scholarship and biography in the United States
 John Hollander, Vision and Resonance, criticism
 Reed Whittemore, William Carlos Williams: Poet from Jersey

Other in English
 Dorothy Hewett, Rapunzel in Suburbia, Australia
 Maki Kureishi, Taufiq Rafat and Kaleem Omar, Wordfall, Oxford University Press, English-language poetry published in Pakistan
 Jennifer Maiden, Australia:
 The Problem of Evil, Prism
 The Occupying Forces, Gargoyle
 Geoff Page, Smalltown Memorials, Australia (St Lucia: University of Queensland Press)
 Wole Soyinka, editor, Poems of Black Africa, part of the Heinemann African Writers Series; published in the United Kingdom; Martin Secker & Warburg Ltd,  (also published in the United States this year)

Works published in other languages
Listed by language and often by nation where the work was first published and again by the poet's native land, if different; substantially revised works listed separately:

Arabic
 Adonis, Al-Aghani al-Thania Li Mehyar al-Dimashki ("The Second Songs of Mihyar al-Dimashki"), Syria
 Mahmood Darwish, a book of poems? (Palestine)
 Abdel Wahhab al-Bayyati, a book of poems? (Iraq)
 Amal Dankal, a book of poems? (Egypt)

Denmark
 Thorkild Bjørnvig:
 Delfinen
 Stoffets krystalhav
 Henrik Nordbrandt, Ode til blæksprutten og andre kærlighedsdigte ("Ode to the Octopus and Other Love Poems"), Copenhagen: Gylendal, 55 pages

French language

France
 Anne-Marie Albiach:
 Césure: le corps
 Le Double
 Jean l'Anselme, La Foire à la ferraille
 Yves Bonnefoy, Dans le leurre du seuil ("The Lure of the Threshold"), long poem with an epic tone and allusions to classical literature
 Charles Bory, L'Enfant-soleil et la croix
 Philippe Denis, Les Cendres de la voix
 Robert Desnos, Destinée arbitraire, published posthumously (died 1945)
 Philippe Dumaine, Aux Passeurs de la nuit
 Jacques Dupin, Debors
 Jean Pourtal de Ladevèze, De La Source azurine
 Pierre Loubière, Poèmes à la craie
 Saint-John Perse,  Chant pour un équinoxe , Paris: Gallimard
 Jean-Louis Vallas, Resonances de Paris

Criticism and scholarship
 Robert Sabatier, Histoire de la poésie française
 volume on the Middle Ages to the sixteenth century
 volume on the seventeenth and eighteenth centuries

German language

West Germany
 , Jokers Gala
 Rolf Dieter Brinkmann, Westwärts 1 und 2 (posthumous)
 Frank Geerk, Notwehr
 Klaus Konjetsky, Poem vom Grünen Eck
 Kaspar H. Spinner,  (scholarship)

Greece
 Kostas Varnalis, 
 Nikiforos Vrettakos, 
 Kostas Stergiopoulos, 
 Yiorgos Yeralis, 
 Yannis Ritsos:
 
 
 
  (written in the Makronisos concentration camp in 1949)
 , about the Turkish invasion of Cyprus
 , a book of essays

Hebrew
 M. Dor, Mappot Hazeman
 Haim Gouri, Ad Kav Ha-Nesher ("The Eagle Line"), by an Israeli writing in Hebrew
 Y. Ratosh, three slim volumes which appeared simultaneously
 I. Pinkas, Al Kav Hamashveh
 Y. Ratosh, three slim volumes which appeared simultaneously
 D. Rokeah, Ir Shezemana Kayitz
 Y. Tan-Pai, Olam Kazeh Olam Kaba
 A. Trainin, Ha-Shaar Hasotum
 Nathan Yonathan, Shirim

India
Listed in alphabetical order by first name:
 Amarjit Chandan, Kauan Nahin Chahega, Rangshala, Chandigarh; Punjabi-language
 K. Siva Reddy, Charya, Hyderabad: Jhari Poetry Circle, Telugu-language
 Namdeo Dhasal, Moorkha Mhatarayane Dongar Halavile; Marathi-language
 Nilmani Phookan, Kaint Golap Aru Kaint, Guwahati, Assam: Dutta Barua, Assamese-language
 Rajendra Kishore Panda, Gouna Devata, Patanagarh, Orissa: Varnamala, Oraya-language
 Suresh Joshi, Pratyancha, Indian, Gujarati-language

Italy
 Carlo Bordini, Strana categoria
 Pier Paolo Pasolini, La nuova gioventú
 Giovanni Raboni, Cadenza d'inganno

Anthology
 Marco Forti (ed.), Almanacco dello Specchio for 1975, an anthology (from Arnoldo Mondadori's publishing house) that includes poems by Eugenio Montale, Mario Luzi, Albino Pierro, Vasco Pratolini, Pier Paolo Pasolini, Giovanni Testori, Giovanni Guiducci, Rossana Ombres

Portuguese language

Portugal
 A. Ramos Rosa, Animal Olhar
 Fiama Brandão, Novas Visões do Passado
 A.-F. Alexandre, Sem Palavras nem Coisas

Russia
 N. Dorizo, The Sword of Victory. Verses, Poems and Songs
 Yu. Drunina, The Star of the Trenches. New Poems
 K. Vanshenkin, Campfire Reminiscences. Wartime Lyrics
 Ya. Smelyakov, Verses of Many Years
 B. Kunyayev, Devotion. Poems
 I. Molchanov, Half a Century. Verses
 G. Korshak, The Stellar Hour
 I. Ulyanova, Birch Tree Rain
 A. Roshka, Steel and Flint (translated into Russian from Moldavian)
 S. Eraliyev, Herald's Word (translated into Russian from Kirgiz)

Soviet anthology
 Winds of Different Colors

Spanish language

Spain
 Vicente Gaos, Diez siglos de poesía
 Luis Cernuda, Antología  poetica, introduction and selection by Philip Silver

Latin America
 Juan Gonzalo Rose, Obra poética (Peru)
 Javier Sologuren, translator from Swiss, Italian and French, Las uvas del racimo (Peru)
 Raúl Gonzáles Tuñón, Antología poética (Argentina), posthumous
 Margit Frenk, Cancionero folklórico, anthology of popular poetry
 Juan Gelman, Obra poética (Argentina)
 Pablo Antonio Cuadra, Tierra que habla (Nicaragua)
 Roberto Fernández Retamar, Cuaderno paralelo (Cuba)
 Jorge Enrique Adoum, Informe personal sobre la situación (Ecuador)
 Olga Orozco, Museo salvage (Argentina)
 Hernán Levín, El que a hierro mata (Chile)
 Octavio Paz, Children of the Mire: Modern Poetry from Romanticism to the Avant-Garde, text of his Charles Eliot Norton lectures at Harvard for 1971–72
 José Coronel Urteche, Rápido tránsito, critical essays

Sweden
 Kjell Espmark, Det obevekliga paradiset, the last volume of a trilogy
 Claes Andersson, Rums kamrater
 Ylva Eggehorn, Han Kommer

Yiddish
 Hirsh Osherovitch, The World of Sacrifices
 Arie Shamri, Rings in Stem
 Hillel Shargel, A Tree in the Window
 M. Shklar, In Imagination Sealed
 Moshe Nadir, A Day in a Garden
 Alef Katz, Morning Star
 Yakov Friedman, Poems and Songs, three volumes (posthumous)

Other
 Zbigniew Herbert, Mr. Cogito, which was translated into 15 languages and dramatized in 1975; Poland
 Ndoc Gjetja, Shqiponja rreh krahët ("Beats Eagle Wings"), Albania
 Miroslav Holub, a book of poetry? Czechoslovakia: Czech
 Julian Przyboś, Poems and Notes (posthumous), Poland
 Jan Skacel, a book of poetry? Czechoslovakia: Czech
 Nichita Stănescu, selected poems Romania
 Ion Alexandru, selected poems Romania

Awards and honors
 Nobel Prize for Literature: Eugenio Montale, Italian poet, prose writer, editor and translator

English language

Canada
 See 1975 Governor General's Awards for a complete list of winners and finalists for those awards

United Kingdom
 Cholmondeley Award:  Jenny Joseph, Norman MacCaig, John Ormond
 Eric Gregory Award: John Birtwhistle, Duncan Bush, Val Warner, Philip Holmes, Peter Cash, Alasdair Paterson

United States
 Bollingen Prize: Archie Randolph Ammons
 National Book Award for Poetry: Marilyn Hacker, Presentation Piece
 Pulitzer Prize for Poetry: Gary Snyder, Turtle Island
 Walt Whitman Award: Reg Saner, Climbing into the Roots
 Fellowship of the Academy of American Poets: Robert Hayden
 Lenore Marshall Poetry Prize: Cid Corman, O/I (Judge: Hayden Carruth)

French language

France
 Prix Appolinaire: Charles Le Quintrec, jeunesse de Dieu
 Grand Prix de poésie of the French Academy: Gabriel Audisio, Racine de tout

Spanish language
 Casa de las Américas prizes:
 Omar Lara (Chile), ¡Oh buenas maneras!
 Manuel Orestes Nieto (Panama), Dar la cara

Other
 A Soviet state prizes for poetry:
 K. Kuliyev, The Book of the Earth
 L. Martynov, Hyperboles

Births
 August 20 – Matthew and Michael Dickman, American poets
 December 21 – Srijato (Srijato Bandopadhyay), Bengali poet
 Nick Laird, Northern Ireland-born poet and novelist
 Tony Tost, American poet
 Razvan Tupa, Romanian poet

Deaths

Birth years link to the corresponding "[year] in poetry" article:
 January 15 – Sydney Goodsir Smith, 59 (born 1915), New Zealand–Scots poet, artist, dramatist and novelist who wrote poetry in literary Scots often referred to as Lallans; a major figure of the Scottish Renaissance
 January 18 – Chester Kallman, 53 (born 1921), American-born poet and librettist
 January 21 – Mascha Kaléko, 67 (born 1907), German-language poet
 February 5 – Janko Glazer, 81 (born 1893), Slovenian poet, literary historian, librarian and editor
 February 10 – Nikos Kavvadias, 65 (born 1910), Russian-born Greek poet and sailor
 February 14 – Sir Julian Sorell Huxley (born 1887), English evolutionary biologist, humanist and internationalist
 March 2 – Helen Cruickshank (born 1886), Scottish poet, suffragette and nationalist
 March 3 – Sir T. H. Parry-Williams (born 1887), Welsh poet, translator and academic
 March 22 – Stanley Young, 69 (born 1906), American poet, playwright, publisher and literary reviewer
 April 23 – Rolf Dieter Brinkmann, 35 (born 1940) German poet, killed in hit-and-run-accident in London
 May 10 – Roque Dalton, 39 (born 1935), leftist Salvadoran poet, journalist and political activist who wrote on death, love and politics, executed
 July 10 – Sir Francis Meynell, 84 (born 1891), English poet
 August 3 – Andreas Embirikos, 73 (born 1901), Greek surrealist poet and psychoanalyst
 August 5 – Vojko Gorjan, 26 (born 1949), Slovenian postmodernist poet
 September 4 – Shigeji Tsuboi 壺井繁治 (born 1897), Japanese poet
 September 20 – Saint-John Perse, 88, French diplomat and poet, winner of the Nobel Prize in literature in 1960
 September 24(?) – Pat Lowther, 40 (born 1935), Canadian poet, murdered by her husband, Roy Lowther
 October 27 – Vayalar Ramavarma, 47 (born 1928), Indian, Malayalam-language poet and film songwriter
 October 28 – Patrice de La Tour du Pin, 64 (born 1911), French writer
 November 2 – Pier Paolo Pasolini, 53, Italian film director, author and poet

Notes

 Britannica Book of the Year 1976 ("for events of 1975"), published by Encyclopædia Britannica 1976 (source of many items in "Works published" section and rarely in other sections)

See also

 Poetry
 List of poetry awards
 List of years in poetry

20th-century poetry

Poetry